Dry Creek is a small river in San Mateo County, California and is a tributary of Tunitas Creek.

See also
List of watercourses in the San Francisco Bay Area

References

Rivers of San Mateo County, California
Rivers of Northern California